The Rhizaria are an ill-defined but species-rich supergroup of mostly unicellular eukaryotes. Except for the Chlorarachniophytes and three species in the genus Paulinella in the phylum Cercozoa, they are all non-photosynthethic, but many foraminifera and radiolaria have a symbiotic relationship with unicellular algae. A multicellular form, Guttulinopsis vulgaris, a cellular slime mold, has also been described.
This group was used by Cavalier-Smith in 2002, although the term "Rhizaria" had been long used for clades within the currently recognized taxon. Being described mainly from rDNA sequences, they vary considerably in form, having no clear morphological distinctive characters (synapomorphies), but for the most part they are amoeboids with filose, reticulose, or microtubule-supported pseudopods. In the absence of an apomorphy, the group is ill-defined, and its composition has been very fluid.  Some Rhizaria possess mineral exoskeletons (thecae or loricas), which are in different clades within Rhizaria made out of opal, celestite, or calcite. Certain species can attain sizes of more than a centimeter with some species being able to form cylindrical colonies approximately 1 cm in diameter and greater than 1 m in length. They feed by capturing and engulfing prey with the extensions of their pseudopodia; forms that are symbiotic with unicellular algae contribute significantly to the total primary production of the ocean.

Groups

The three main groups of Rhizaria are:

 Cercozoa – various amoebae and flagellates, usually with filose pseudopods and common in soil
 Foraminifera – amoeboids with reticulose pseudopods, common as marine benthos
 Radiolaria – amoeboids with axopods, common as marine plankton

A few other groups may be included in the Cercozoa, but some trees appear closer to the Foraminifera. These are the Phytomyxea and Ascetosporea, parasites of plants and animals, respectively, and the peculiar amoeba Gromia. The different groups of Rhizaria are considered close relatives based mainly on genetic similarities, and have been regarded as an extension of the Cercozoa. The name Rhizaria for the expanded group was introduced by Cavalier-Smith in 2002, who also included the centrohelids and Apusozoa.

A noteworthy order that belongs to Ascetosporea is the Mikrocytida. These are parasites of oysters. This includes the causative agent of Denman Island Disease, Mikrocytos mackini a small (2−3 μm diameter) amitochondriate protistan.

Evolutionary relationships

Rhizaria are part of the SAR supergroup (Stramenopiles, Alveolates, Rhizaria), a grouping that had been presaged in 1993 through a study of mitochondrial morphologies. SAR is currently placed in the Diaphoretickes along with Archaeplastida, Cryptista, Haptista, and several minor clades.

Historically, many rhizarians were considered animals because of their motility and heterotrophy. However, when a simple animal-plant dichotomy was superseded by a recognition of additional kingdoms, taxonomists generally placed amoebae in the kingdom Protista. When scientists began examining the evolutionary relationships among eukaryotes in the 1970's, it became clear that the kingdom Protista was paraphyletic. Rhizaria appear to share a common ancestor with Stramenopiles and Alveolates forming part of the SAR (Stramenopiles+Alveolates+Rhizaria) super assemblage. Rhizaria has been supported by molecular phylogenetic studies as a monophyletic group. Biosynthesis of 24-isopropyl cholestane precursors in various rhizaria suggests a relevant ecological role already during the Ediacaran.

Phylogeny

Rhizaria is a monophyletic group composed of two sister phyla: Cercozoa and Retaria. Subsequently, Cercozoa and Retaria are also monophyletic. The following cladogram depicts the evolutionary relationships between all rhizarian classes, and is made after the works of Cavalier-Smith et al. (2018), and Irwin et al. (2019).

References

External links 
 Molecular Phylogeny of Amoeboid Protists - Tree of Rhizaria
 Tree of Life Eukaryota
 https://www-nature-com.

 
Neoproterozoic first appearances
Taxa named by Thomas Cavalier-Smith
Infrakingdoms